The plain laughingthrush or Père David's laughingthrush (Pterorhinus davidi) is a species of bird in the family Leiothrichidae. It is endemic to central and northeastern China. Its natural habitat is temperate forests.

Taxonomy
The plain laughingthrush was described by the English zoologist Robert Swinhoe in 1868 from a specimen collected in Beijing, China. He coined the binomial name Pterorhinus davidi. The specific epithet honours the French missionary Armand David (1826-1900) who worked in China between 1858 and 1874. This species was normally placed in the genus Garrulax but following the publication of a comprehensive molecular phylogenetic study in 2018, the genus Pterorhinus was resurrected and plain laughingthrush was returned to its original genus.

References

External links
Image at ADW

plain laughingthrush
Birds of Central China
Birds of Manchuria
Endemic birds of China
plain laughingthrush
Taxonomy articles created by Polbot
Taxobox binomials not recognized by IUCN